Rock 'n' Roll Telephone is the twenty-third album by Scottish rock band Nazareth, released in June 2014 by Union Square Music. It is their last album with original singer Dan McCafferty who left the group before its release, and later died in 2022.

Track listing

Personnel 
Nazareth
 Dan McCafferty – lead vocals
 Jimmy Murrison – guitars, backing vocals, keyboards
 Pete Agnew – bass, backing vocals
 Lee Agnew – drums, backing vocals, percussion, keyboards

Charts

References 

Nazareth (band) albums
2014 albums